Louis M. Aucoin is the United Nations Secretary-General Deputy Special Representative (Rule of Law) for Liberia.

Biography
In 1971, he graduated from the College of the Holy Cross with a BA in modern languages.  He earned a JD in 1975 from the Boston College Law School.

Career
At the time of his UN appointment, Aucoin worked aa the academic director of the Master of Laws program in international law at The Fletcher School at Tufts University. He also taught law at the Sorbonne as a Fulbright lecturer and for fifteen years as a professor at the Boston University School of Law.

References

1950 births
Living people
American officials of the United Nations
College of the Holy Cross alumni
Boston College Law School alumni
Academic staff of the University of Paris
The Fletcher School at Tufts University faculty
Place of birth missing (living people)
Boston University School of Law faculty